The Carlsbad Marathon started out as the San Diego Marathon. It is said to be one of the oldest races on the West Coast. In 1978, The Heart of San Diego Marathon, was created and thus there were 2 marathons in San Diego. When InMotion Inc. was hired to put on the marathon, they made the decision to combine the two marathons and then eventually the marathon was moved from San Diego to Carlsbad.

For the marathon, the runners will need to complete 26 miles in the allotted time. For the half marathon the runner will need to complete a course of 13.1 miles.

About the Marathon and Half Marathon

The Carlsbad Marathon and Half Marathon is a winter race that takes place in the small beach town of Carlsbad, California. Carlsbad is part of North San Diego County and is home to residents. The race, which takes place in January, offers runners views of the Pacific Ocean as they run down the coast. participants will run through the small and affluent beach community of Carlsbad Village and along the beaches and lagoons that make up Highway 101.  Both the marathon and half marathon will start and finish at the Westfield Carlsbad this year, located at 2525 El Camino Real, Carlsbad, CA 92008.

There is a time limit in place for both races. Runners will have 6 hours total to complete the full marathon and 4 hours to complete the half. Those runners that participate in the full marathon will be eligible for the Triple Crown once they have finished the race. The other two races they must complete include one in La Jolla in April and the last in San Diego in August.

References

Marathons in California
Marathons in the United States